State of Affairs may refer to:

State of affairs (sociology)
State of affairs (philosophy)
State of Affairs (Kool & the Gang album), 1996
State of Affairs (TV series), a TV series which made its debut in fall of 2014